, previously known as Arata, is a Japanese actor, model and fashion designer. He is the Director of fashion brand Elnest Creative Activity. He holds the position of Director at the Artisan Culture Organisation Institute.

Biography 
Iura co-starred in Yukio Ninagawa's Snakes and Earrings with Yuriko Yoshitaka and Kengo Kora. He appeared in Junji Sakamoto's Strangers in the City. He portrayed Yukio Mishima in Koji Wakamatsu's 11:25 The Day He Chose His Own Fate. He also appeared in several of Hirokazu Koreeda's films, including After Life, Distance and Air Doll.

Filmography

Film 
 After Life (1998)
 Shady Grove (1999)
 Distance (2001)
 Ping Pong (2002)
 Aoi Kuruma (2004)
 Gina K (2005)
 Yaji and Kita: The Midnight Pilgrims (2005)
 The Prisoner (2007)
 Purukogi (2007)
 United Red Army (2007)
 Snakes and Earrings (2008)
 20th Century Boys (2008)
 Air Doll (2009)
 Ultra Miracle Love Story (2009)
 John Rabe (2009)
 Caterpillar (2010)
 Zatoichi: The Last (2010)
 Strangers in the City (2010)
 Kimi ni Todoke (2010)
 11:25 The Day He Chose His Own Fate (2012), Yukio Mishima
 Our Homeland (2012)
 Bakugyaku Familia (2012)
 Sue, Mai & Sawa: Righting the Girl Ship (2012)
 The Millennial Rapture (2013)
 The Ravine of Goodbye (2013)
 Like Father, like Son (2013)
 A Band Rabbit and a Boy (2013)
 Cape Nostalgia (2014)
 Asleep (2015), Iwanaga
 High & Low: The Movie (2016)
 And Then There Was Light (2017)
 Waiting for the Moon (2017)
 Smokin' on the Moon (2018), Sōta Amaya
 Red Snow (2018)
 Dare to Stop Us (2018), Kōji Wakamatsu
 The Negotiator: Behind The Reversion of Okinawa (2018)
 The Chrysanthemum and the Guillotine (2018), Genjirō Muraki
 Raiden (2019)
 Amber Light (2019)
 Dragon Quest: Your Story (2019), Grandmaster Nimzo (voice)
 Miyamoto (2019)
 Stolen Identity 2 (2020)
 True Mothers (2020), Kiyokazu Kurihara
 Ninja Girl (2021), Kōji Noma
 Omoide Shashin (2021)
 The Master (2021)
 The Road to Murder: The Movie (2021)
 Skeleton Flowers (2021)
 Parasite in Love (2021)
 Child of Kamiari Month (2021), Norimasa Hayama (voice)
 Niwatori Phoenix (2022), Sōta Amaya
 The World with Maki (2022)
 Rageaholic (2022)
 This Is Amiko (2022), Amiko's father
 Fukuda-mura Jiken (2023), Tomokazu Sawada

Television 
 Mori no Asagao (2010)
 Mitsu no Aji: A Taste of Honey (2011)
 Taira no Kiyomori (2012), Emperor Sutoku
 Rich Man, Poor Woman (2012)
 The Negotiator: Behind The Reversion of Okinawa (2017)
 Unnatural (2018)
 Natsuzora (2019), Tsutomu Naka
 Nippon Noir (2019), Saimon Kaname
 Ru: Taiwan Express (2020), Makoto Anzai
 The Road to Murder (2020)
 Dearest (2021)
 First Love (2022)
 The Makanai: Cooking for the Maiko House (2023), Masahiro Tanabe
 Hikaru Kimi e (2024), Fujiwara no Michitaka

Documentary 
 The Great Asian Highway (2015)

Video games 
 Yakuza 0 (2015), Tetsu Tachibana

References

External links 
 Official website 
 
 

Japanese male actors
1974 births
Living people
People from Hino, Tokyo
Models from Tokyo Metropolis